is a subway station on the Tokyo Metro Marunouchi Line in Suginami, Tokyo, Japan, operated by the Tokyo subway operator Tokyo Metro.

Lines
It is numbered "M-04".

Station layout
The station consists of two underground side platforms serving two tracks on the first basement level. The platforms are served by their own sets of ticket barriers, with access to the surface from Exits for platform 1, and 2 and 3 for platform 2. The two platforms are also linked by an underground passageway.

Platforms

History
The station opened on 18 September 1964.

The station facilities were inherited by Tokyo Metro after the privatization of the Teito Rapid Transit Authority (TRTA) in 2004.

Passenger statistics
In fiscal 2011, the station was used by an average of 30,833 passengers daily.

Surrounding area
 Renkōji Temple, where the ashes of Subhas Chandra Bose is preserved.
 Sanshi-no-mori Park

References

External links

 Higashi-koenji Station information (Tokyo Metro) 

Stations of Tokyo Metro
Tokyo Metro Marunouchi Line
Railway stations in Tokyo
Railway stations in Japan opened in 1964